Life on the Line is a 2015 American direct-to-video disaster thriller film directed by David Hackl and written by Primo Brown, Marvin Peart and Peter I. Horton. The film stars John Travolta, Kate Bosworth, Devon Sawa, Gil Bellows, Julie Benz, Ryan Robbins and Sharon Stone. The film was released on November 18, 2016, by Lionsgate Premiere. The film's story follows a crew of electrical linemen who while working to maintain the power grid of their Texas town find themselves in the middle of a deadly storm and have to fight for their lives.

Plot

A man named Duncan gives an interview for a documentary. He is asked what it is like for him to be a lineman.

A lineman named Danny Ginner speaks with his daughter Bailey, who is frightened of the storm. Danny leaves and goes out to fix a downed power line with a crew during a rainstorm. When a truck arrives, Danny's brother Beau shows up. Beau climbs the line and fixes a shorted wire.

Danny notices that Beau missed a crucial spot. When Beau offers to go back up, Danny stops him and chooses to do it himself. As he is fixing the wire, the power line is struck by lightning, sending Danny plummeting to the ground. Danny is rushed to the hospital. Maggie, who is Danny's wife, rushes to the hospital. As she is distracted, her car is struck by a truck at an intersection, killing her. The next morning, Beau visits the house and comforts Bailey, his niece.

Fifteen years later. Beau and Bailey are living together. Bailey is a waitress at a local diner, while Beau is now the head lineman for the company. Before they head out, Beau and Bailey notice that new neighbors are moving in across the street, who are identified to be Carline and Eugene. Beau notices that Eugene also works for the power company. Beau goes to work and discovers that the other workers, including his friend known as Pok' Chop have thrown him a surprise birthday party.

Later that day, Beau finds that Duncan has started working for the same company. It is revealed that Duncan and Bailey used to date, but that something happened between them. Duncan is later shown living with his alcoholic mother. Duncan is trying to rekindle the relationship, much to the dismay of another one of Bailey's ex-boyfriends, Ron.

Eugene and Carline's relationship is strained when it is revealed that Carline had cheated on Eugene in the past and that is why he is suspicious whenever he sees Carline near a man or talking to another man.

After spending some time together, Carline notices that Bailey is pregnant. Bailey reveals that it is Duncan's baby. Beau wants Bailey to go to college, but Bailey is conflicted since she is pregnant.

Ron comes over to try to rekindle his relationship with Bailey but is unable to when Carline comes to help Bailey run Ron away. Later that night, Bailey looks out the window and notices a taxicab pull up to Carline & Eugene's house. She sees Carline coming out of the house and getting into the taxi, while Eugene is at work.

Eugene becomes increasingly suspicious of Carline, even to the point of going through her phone. When she catches him doing so, she takes her phone from him. He tells her that he has seen phone numbers on her phone that he didn't recognize. Carline tells him that she's been spending a lot of time with Bailey and her friends. Later on, as he is about to head to work, Eugene notices Bailey about to leave. He goes over to ask Bailey if she's been spending time with his wife. He mentions her friends and Bailey looks confused. Carline spots this and comes over to find out what Eugene is talking to Bailey about.

Eventually, Bailey & Duncan rekindle their relationship, much to Beau's dismay, since he wants Bailey to go to college and make a life for herself. One night at a local bar, Beau gets drunk and voices his opinion to Duncan, until Pok' Chop goes to intervene and tells Beau to go home.

When a storm arrives, a power line falls down and causes the pole to fall onto a set of train tracks. Shortly afterward, a train runs into the downed power line and derails. Beau and his team are called out to help.

On another side of town, Eugene calls Carline and tells her that all he wanted was to hear her voice.

Eugene climbs to the top of an electrical tower and contemplates committing suicide. He eventually decides against it and goes home.

As night falls, the storm steadily worsens. Ron gets out of his car and heads towards Eugene and Carline's place. He breaks into the house and tries to assault Carline, due to her comments towards him from earlier. Eugene arrives on scene and brandishes a gun.

Bailey sees Eugene going into the house with a gun, so she grabs her sweater and a flashlight and goes to help. Eugene sees Ron trying to rape Carline and breaks it up. Eugene aims his gun at Ron, but Bailey comes in and inadvertently shines the flashlight into Eugene's face. Ron uses the distraction to try to grab Eugene's gun, which leads to several shots being fired and Ron gets shot several times, killing him. Eugene and Carline reconcile, but Carline notices that Bailey has been shot in the stomach. They rush her to the hospital. Pok' Chop, there because a lineman was hurt from the storm, notices Bailey and calls Beau.

The storm knocks out the power to the rest of the city, and the doctor at the hospital cannot perform surgery. Pok' Chop calls Beau and tells him that they need the power back on or else Bailey will not make it. Beau tells Duncan what has happened to Bailey and they must restore power with no time to spare.

Beau and Duncan make it to the central power hub to see what happened. After exhausting all their options, Beau notices the problem: a fuse has popped preventing power from flowing from one part of the central hub to another part. Beau climbs part of the tower to restore power. Beau uses a hot stick to push down on the fuse but is not successful. Beau apologizes to Duncan for mistreating him. Beau then jumps on to the fuse using his body weight to force the fuse to connect. This works and power is restored, but it causes Beau to get electrocuted, and he is thrown off the tower. At the hospital Bailey is able to be saved. The next morning, Duncan goes to the hospital and comforts Bailey.

During the interview, Duncan says that Beau was the definition of a lineman and that he hopes he can be even half the lineman that Beau was. Duncan gets a call on his radio, saying that he is needed because a storm is going to be coming in.

Two years later, Duncan, Bailey, their baby, Pok' Chop, and another lineman are seen approaching a monument. The monument, located in front of an electrical tower, is dedicated to all the local lineman that have lost their lives in the service of their job. Danny and Beau's names are seen among the names.

Cast
 John Travolta as Beau Ginner
 Kate Bosworth as Bailey Ginner
 Devon Sawa as Duncan
 Gil Bellows as Pok' Chop
 Julie Benz as Carline
 Ryan Robbins as Eugene
 Ty Olsson as Danny Ginner
 Sharon Stone as Duncan's Mother
 Reese Alexander as Russell
 Emilie Ullerup as Becky
 Stuart Stone as Hunter
 Matt Bellefleur as Ron
 Lydia Styslinger as Elly
 Christian Michael Cooper as Dillon
 Sidney Grigg as Young Bailey Ginner
 Jim Shield as Norm
 Louis Ferreira as Mr. Fontaine
 Angelina Lyubomirova as Alicia 
 Dean Wray as George
 Edwin Perez as Jorge
 Elan Ross Gibson as Cook
 Derek Hamilton as Raymond
 Toby Levins as Phil
 Milo Shandel as Travis
 Bo Steele as Bar Musician

Release
The film premiered at the Napa Valley Film Festival on November 5, 2015. The film was released on November 18, 2016, by Lionsgate Premiere.

Reception
On Rotten Tomatoes the film has an approval rating of 0% based on reviews from 15 critics.

Sheri Linden of The Hollywood Reporter wrote: "Life may be on the line, but it's in short supply on the screen."

References

External links
 

2015 films
2010s disaster films
2015 thriller drama films
American disaster films
American thriller drama films
American survival films
2010s English-language films
Films directed by David Hackl
2015 drama films
2010s American films